Loma Hermosa is a town in Tres de Febrero Partido of Buenos Aires Province, Argentina. It is located in the Greater Buenos Aires urban agglomeration. Part of the town falls in the General San Martín Partido.

Sport
The Asociación Social y Deportiva Justo José de Urquiza football club is based in Loma Hermosa.

Notable people 
Claudia Ciardone, model and theatre actress

External links

Populated places in Buenos Aires Province
Tres de Febrero Partido